The Georgia Tech Yellow Jackets baseball team represents the Georgia Institute of Technology in NCAA Division I college baseball.  Along with most other Georgia Tech athletic teams, the baseball team participates in the Atlantic Coast Conference.  The Yellow Jackets play their home games in Russ Chandler Stadium and they are currently coached by Danny Hall.

History

Baseball is a very successful sport at Georgia Tech, where it is one of the premier baseball teams in the NCAA. Georgia Tech baseball is notable for its high-scoring offenses and stout defenses. Before Tech had its own baseball field, it played at Brisbine Park.

The team's success is guided by head coach Danny Hall. Danny Hall has coached Tech since 1994 and has posted 1,039 wins over that span. He has led Georgia Tech to 20 years of NCAA regional play and its only three College World Series appearances in 1994, 2002, and 2006.

The baseball team, under Hall, has become an annual contender for the ACC regular season and tournament titles winning each four and three times respectively.

Stadium

The Yellow Jackets play their home games in Russ Chandler Stadium.

Head coaches

Year-by-year results

Information Source:

Georgia Tech in the NCAA tournament
The NCAA Division I baseball tournament started in 1947.
The format of the tournament has changed through the years.

Award winners

Dick Howser Trophy

Golden Spikes Award

Johnny Bench Award

Individual Conference awards

ACC Player of the Year

ACC Pitcher of the Year

ACC Coach of the Year

Former players

Some notable Georgia Tech baseball players are Erskine Mayer, Kevin Brown, Nomar Garciaparra, Jason Varitek, Matt Murton, Jay Payton, Mark Teixeira, Matt Wieters, Charlie Blackmon, and Joey Bart.  Varitek's number 33 is the only number retired at Georgia Tech.

See also
List of NCAA Division I baseball programs

References

External links